Biomedical cybernetics investigates signal processing, decision making and control structures in living organisms. Applications of this research field are in biology, ecology and health sciences.

Fields
 Biological cybernetics
 Medical cybernetics

Methods
 Connectionism
 Decision theory
 Information theory
 Systeomics
 Systems theory

See also
 Cybernetics
 Prosthetics
 List of biomedical cybernetics software

References

Kitano, H. (Hrsg.) (2001). Foundations of Systems Biology. Cambridge (Massachusetts), London, MIT Press, .

External links

ResearchGate topic on biomedical cybernetics

 
Cybernetics